The International Rheinland-Pfalz Rundfahrt was a multi-stage road bicycle race held in Rhineland-Palatinate, Germany. In the years from 1966 to 2007, it was considered one of the biggest sporting events in Rhineland-Palatinate. No other city was as often the stage destination of the Rheinland-Pfalz Rundfahrt as Bad Marienberg.

In its early years, it was an amateur race. The edition of 1969 was notable for the domination of Fedor den Hertog, winning nine of the eleven stages, and the overall classification with a large margin. After 2005 it was part of the UCI Europe Tour and part of the new  (TUI Cup). In the past the race took place in September during the Vuelta a España. Starting in 2005, the race, classified in category 2.1 due to the newly introduced UCI ProTour, took place in May during the Giro d'Italia and just before the Tour of Catalonia.

Since 1981, a mountain and a sprint classification have been introduced. In 2007, for the first time a classification for the best young professional was introduced (blue jersey).

Due to the cases of doping in cycling, the Rheinland-Pfalz Rundfahrt was cancelled in 2008. The Minister of the Interior of Rhineland-Palatinate, Karl Peter Bruch, announced that the state would not issue a permit for the race from 2008 and that the police would not be called off. "The current extent of the doping allegations has prompted the state government to suspend the financing of the Rheinland-Pfalz Rundfahrt for the year 2008. We feel compelled to send this clear signal," said Bruch. As a result, it is unlikely that the tour will be held after 2008. Another setback in this respect is the dissolution of the organising association "Internationale Rheinland-Pfalz-Rad-Rundfahrt" on 5 December 2007. The official reason for this step is the resulting cost savings.

Winners

References

External links
  

UCI Europe Tour races
Cycle races in Germany
Recurring sporting events established in 1966
1966 establishments in West Germany
Sport in Rhineland-Palatinate
Defunct cycling races in Germany
Recurring sporting events disestablished in 2007
2007 disestablishments in Germany